El Franco is a municipality in the Autonomous Community of the Principality of Asturias. It is bordered on the north by the Cantabrian Sea, and to the west by Tapia de Casariego, to the south by Castropol and Boal, and to the east by Coaña. El Franco is part of the Comarca Eo Navia.

The Porcia and Mazo Rivers pass through the municipality.

History 

Artifacts from  Neolithic Age book an early settlement of the region. Still today rests of Hill forts, in Arancedo as well as in the neighbouring Coaña and Mohias are visible. In the 18th century the old gold mines which are in use until today were found near the embankment castle of Arancedo. During the Middle Ages  El Franco was split in the dioceses by Lugo and Oviedo, the administrative capital was in this time, Castropol. In 1852 the administrative seat was laid to El Franco finally in the Parroquia La Caridad where it is still today.

El Franco is the birthplace of Corín Tellado, one of the world best-selling writers in Spanish language.

Demographics

Economy 

At the top of the employees lies the Livestock and Fishery. The milk industry is provided here still with the highest growth, after in the fishing the preventive measures of the EU started to reach. The tourism industry and administrative companies form the second largest position of the employers and the tourism shows the biggest growth of the region. Smaller, commercial companies and production companies are found predominantly in the small industrial parks of the adjoining municipality.

Politics

Parishes

Arancedo
A Braña
A Caridá
Llebredo
Miudes
San Xuan de Prendonés
Valdepares
Villalmarzo

Points of interest 
 La iglesia (Church) de Santa María, built on romanic Basementen finished in the 18th century
 El palacio de Miudes from the 16th century
 El palacio de Fonfría from the 16th century
 El palacio de Jardón
 La torre (Tower) Valdepares

Fiestas and Ferias 
 24. June -  San Juan de Prendones in Valdepares.
 16. July, el Carmen - in Miudes.
 2. August, Santo Ángel in Viavélez
 from 8. September on: el día de los Remedios

References

External links

Federación Asturiana de Concejos 
Guía del Occidente. El Franco 

Municipalities in Asturias